In zoological nomenclature, emendations are alterations made to the spelling of taxon names. In bacteriological nomenclature, emendations are made to the circumscription of a taxon.

In zoology
The change must be consciously made along with justification for altering the spelling originally used by the taxon author while describing the species. Any other spelling changes are considered to be unjustified. Valid emendations include changes made to correct:
 typographical errors in the original work describing the species;
 errors in transliteration from non-Latin scripts;
 names that included diacritics or hyphens;
 endings of species to match the gender of the generic name, particularly when the combination has been changed.
The binomial authority remains unchanged.

References 

Taxonomy (biology)